The 2019 Saint Francis Red Flash football team represented Saint Francis University in the 2019 NCAA Division I FCS football season. They were led by tenth-year head coach Chris Villarrial and played their home games at DeGol Field as a member of the Northeast Conference.

Previous season

The Red Flash finished the 2018 season 4–7, 2–4 in NEC play to finish in a tie for fifth place.

Preseason

Preseason coaches' poll
The NEC released their preseason coaches' poll on July 24, 2019. The Red Flash were picked to finish in sixth place.

Preseason All-NEC team
The Red Flash had four players at four positions selected to the preseason all-NEC team.

Offense

Christian Eubanks – OL

Defense

Da'Jon Lee – LB

Nick Rinella – DB

Specialists

Nick Rinella –

Schedule

Game summaries

at Lehigh

at James Madison

Merrimack

Columbia

at Bryant

Robert Morris

at LIU

Sacred Heart

at Duquesne

at Central Connecticut

Wagner

at Delaware State

References

Saint Francis
Saint Francis Red Flash football seasons
Saint Francis Red Flash football